, better known for its international title as The Ninja Dragon (not to be confused with the 1986 Hong Kong film Ninja Dragon (1986) directed by Godfrey Ho), is a 1990 Japanese direct-to-video action film released by the Tohokushinsha Film Corporation.

It was directed by Go Nagai, his third film as director and his first as a solo director. The film was produced by Dynamic Planning, Moby Dick and the Tohokushinsha Film Corporation. A Laserdisc version was also released in Japan.

It was the first film starring Japanese  rock musician Kenji Otsuki. It also features famous female Japanese wrestlers Cutie Suzuki and Mayumi Ozaki, and also Japanese idol Etsuko Shinkoda. The film has cameos of Ken Ishikawa, Chiaki Kawamata, Shintaro Ko, Yoichi Komatsuzawa, Tokitoshi Shiota, Haruka Takachiho, Kunio Nagatani, Kaizo Hayashi, Fujiko F. Fujio, Mari Yagisawa and Tetsu Yano.

A manga was also created by Go Nagai and Shinoyama Isami, and released as a single tankōbon on November 7, 1990 by Kadokawa Shoten.

Cast
 Kenji Otsuki as Ryu Momoji/Yu Shinoyama/Ninja Dragon
 Tetsuya Matsui as Suzuka Hatai/Ninja Defender
 Cutie Suzuki as Jun Saruwatari
 Etsuko Shinkoda as Shinobu Nindo
 Mayumi Ozaki as Female Killer
 Ikko Furuya as Takeo Nindo
 Rikiya Yasuoka as Go Ranjuji
 Katsumi Muramatsu 
 Kobuhei Hayashiya 
 Yoshiaki Umegaki

English voice cast
 Eric Stuart as Ninja Dragon
 Tom Wayland as Suzuka Hatai
 Lotus as Jun Saruwatari
 Anne Sackmann as Shinobu Nindo
 Bill Carney as Takeo Nindo
 Barry Banner
 Tim Brash
 Wally Cole
 Ross Lefko

International releases
The film was licensed in North America by Central Park Media and was released onto DVD and VHS, under their Asia Pulp Cinema label. The English dub was produced by Audioworks Producers Group in New York City.

2002-07-02 subtitled VHS version
2002-08-13 dubbed VHS version
2002-08-13 subtitled/dubbed DVD version
2005-05-24 subtitled/dubbed DVD version (Canada)

External links
Kuso Kagaku Ninkyoden: Gokudo Ninja Dosuryu  at allcinema
Kuso Kagaku Ninkyoden: Gokudo Ninja Dosuryu  at the Japanese Movie Database

Kuso Kagaku Ninkyoden: Gokudo Ninja Dosuryu (manga and light novel)  at The World of Go Nagai webpage
Kuso Kagaku Ninkyoden: Gokudo Ninja Dosuryu profile  at Moby Dick website

1990 films
1990s action films
Central Park Media
Go Nagai
1990s Japanese-language films
Ninja films
1990s Japanese films